1st Fominovka is a rural locality (a village) in Novoselskoye Rural Settlement of Kormilovsky District, Russia. The population was 160 as of 2010.

History 
The town was founded in 1907. In 1928, the village of 1st Fominovka consisted of 72 households, the main population being Russians. It was a part of Novoselskoye village council of Kormilovsky district of Omsk region of Siberian territory.

Streets 
 Gagarina

Geography 
1st Fominovka is located 26 km south of Kormilovka (the district's administrative centre) by road. 2nd Fominovka is the nearest rural locality.

References 

Rural localities in Omsk Oblast